Prabandha-Chintamani (IAST: Prabandha-cintāmaṇi) is an Indian Sanskrit-language collection of prabandhas (semi-historical biographical narratives). It was compiled in c. 1304 CE, in the Vaghela kingdom of present-day Gujarat, by Jain scholar Merutunga.

Contents 

The book is divided into five prakashas (parts):

 Prakasha I
 Vikramarka
 Shatavahana
 Munja
 Mularaja
 Prakasha II
 Bhoja and Bhima
 Prakasha III
 Jayasimha Siddharaja
 Prakasha IV
 Kumarapala
 Viradhavala
 Vastupala and Tejapala
 Prakasha V
 Lakshmanasena
 Jayachandra
 Varahamihira
 Bhartrihari
 Vaidya Vagabhatta

Historical reliability 

As a work of history, Prabandha-Chintamani is inferior to contemporary historical literature, such as the Muslim chronicles. Merutunga states that he wrote the book to "replace the oft-heared ancient stories which no longer delighted the wise". His book includes a large number of interesting anecdotes, but many of these anecdotes are fictitious.

Merutunga finished writing the book in c. 1304 CE (1361 Vikrama Samvat). However, while narrating historical incidents, he does not give much importance to contemporary period, of which he possessed direct knowledge. His book contains historical narratives from 940 CE to 1250 CE, for which he had to rely on oral tradition and earlier texts. Because of this, his book ended up becoming a collection of unreliable anecdotes.

Several contemporary or near-contemporary works of Gujarat do not mention any dates while narrating historical incidents. Merutunga perhaps realized that it was important to mention exact dates in writing history, and provides several dates in his Prabandha-Chintamani. However, most of these dates are wrong by a few months or a year. It appears that Merutunga knew years of historical incidents from the earlier records, and fabricated the exact dates to make his work more believable. The text also features instances of anachronism; for example, Varahamihira (6th century CE) is described as a contemporary of a Nanda king (4th century BCE).

Since the work was composed in Gujarat, it portrays the rulers of Gujarat positively, in comparison to the rival rulers of the neighbouring kingdom of Malwa.

Critical editions and translations 

In 1888, Shastri Ramachandra Dinanatha edited and published Prabandha-Chintamani. In 1901, Charles Henry Tawney translated it into English at the suggestion of Georg Bühler. Durgasankar Shastri revised Dinanatha's edition, and published it in 1932. Muni Jinvijay published another edition in 1933, and also translated the text into Hindi language.

References

Bibliography

External links 

 The Prabandhacintamani, or Wishing-stone of Narratives, composed by Merutunga-Acharya, translated into English by C. H. Tawney

14th-century books
Medieval Indian literature
Works about monarchs
Sanskrit literature